Pterynotus aparri is a species of sea snail, a marine gastropod mollusk in the family Muricidae, the murex snails or rock snails.

Description
The size of an adult shell varies between 30 mm and 40 mm.

Distribution
This species is distributed in the Pacific Ocean along the Philippines.

References

 Merle D., Garrigues B. & Pointier J.-P. (2011) Fossil and Recent Muricidae of the world. Part Muricinae. Hackenheim: Conchbooks. 648 pp. page(s): 124

External links
 

aparrii
Gastropods described in 1980